Khao Kala is a tambon (sub-district) and neighbourhood in Nakhon Sawan Province, upper central Thailand.

Geography
Khao Kala is a line of low mountains shaped like an inverted coconut shell. Hence the name "Khao Kala" (coconut shell hill) according to its shape. The area of Khao Kala range covers the entire area of Tambon Khao Kala, Phayuha Khiri District to Tambon Phra Non in Mueang Nakhon Sawan District or capital of Nakhon Sawan Province.

Most of the area is plateau and mountainous.

Khao Kala has a total area of 217.23 square kilometers (about 135,768.75 rais).

Adjoining areas are (from north clockwise): Phra Non in Mueang Nakhon Sawan District, Hua Thanon in Tha Tako District, Nikhom Khao Bo Kaeo in its district, Udom Thanya in Tak Fa District, and Khao Thong with Nikhom Khao Bo Kaeo in its district, respectively.

Demography
Total population of 8,458 people (4,114 men, and 4,344 women) in 2,999 households.

Economy
Most of the population has a career in sugarcane farming. The occupation of the rice farmers is a minority.

Administration
Khao Kala is governed by the Subdistrict Administrative Organization (SAO) Khao Kala (เทศบาลตำบลเขากะลา).

The tambon is divided into 19 administrative mubans (village)

Utilities
Khao Kala has four local hospitals, 19 local health centres, four drugstores.

There are a total of nine temples and two abbeys.

In education, Khao Kala consists of five child development centres, six primary schools, one secondary school, six public libraries, and one non-formal education centre.

In communication, there are two post offices, 16 public telephone booths.

Every household has electricity and water supply.

UFO hotspot

Khao Kala is famous for being the only UFO hotspot in Thailand. Some locals believe it's where aliens will land the UFOs, or be seen frequently. Although outsiders or even some locals don't believe that. However, they dubbed Khao Kala "Area 51 of Thailand".

Cites

External links

Tambon of Nakhon Sawan Province
Neighbourhoods in Thailand